Hen Run is a  long 1st order tributary to the Youghiogheny River in Fayette County, Pennsylvania.

Course
Hen Run rises about 2 miles west of Confluence, Pennsylvania, and then flows east to join the Youghiogheny River at Confluence.

Watershed
Hen Run drains  of area, receives about 47.1 in/year of precipitation, has a wetness index of 328.98, and is about 72% forested.

See also
List of rivers of Pennsylvania

References

Tributaries of the Youghiogheny River
Rivers of Pennsylvania
Rivers of Fayette County, Pennsylvania